Edward Pleydell (c. 1657 – 1731) was the member of Parliament for Cricklade from 1698 to 1700.

References 

1650s births
1731 deaths
Year of birth uncertain
18th-century English people
English MPs 1698–1700
Members of Parliament for Cricklade